The following outline is provided as an overview of and topical guide to sailing:

Sailing –  the use of wind to provide the primary power via sail(s) or wing to propel a craft over water, ice or land. A sailor manages the force of the wind on the sails by adjusting their angle with respect to the moving sailing craft and sometimes by adjusting the sail area.

Overview 

Sailing can be described as all of the following:
 Exercise – bodily activity that enhances or maintains physical fitness and overall health or wellness.
 Recreation – activity of leisure, leisure being discretionary time.
 Outdoor recreation –
 Sport – organized, competitive, entertaining, and skillful physical activity requiring commitment, strategy, and fair play, in which a winner can be defined by objective means.
 Transport – movement of people and goods from one location to another.
 Boating – travel or transport by boat; or the recreational use of a boat (whether powerboats, sailboats, or man-powered vessels such as rowing and paddle boats) focused on the travel itself or on sports activities, such as fishing.
 Travel – movement of people between relatively distant geographical locations for any purpose and any duration, with or without any additional means of transport.
 Tourism – travel for recreational, leisure or business purposes.

Types of sailing 
 Canoe sailing
 Cruising (maritime)
 Dinghy sailing
 Sailing (sport)
 Dinghy racing
 Match racing
 Fleet racing
 Team racing
 Speed sailing
 Single-handed sailing
 Yachting

History of sailing 

History of sailing
 Age of Sail

Types of sailing vessels 

 Sailboat
 Catboat
 Cutter (boat)
 Day sailer
 Dinghy
 Skiff (sailing)
 Keelboat
 Ketch
 Pleasure craft
 Sailing hydrofoil
 Sailing yacht (small)
 Sloop
 Yawl
 Sailing ship
 Bermuda sloop
 Clipper
 Medium clipper
 Extreme clipper
 Dutch clipper
 Junk (ship)
 Ketch
 Sailing yacht (large)
 Schooner
 Sportsboat
 Tall ship

Parts of a sailing vessel
 Aftercastle
 Anchor
 Anchor windlass
 Beakhead
 Bilge
 Bilgeboard
 Boom brake
 Bow
 Bowsprit
 Capstan
 Cathead
 Centreboard
 Chains
 Cockpit
 Crow's nest
 Daggerboard
 Deck
 Figurehead
 Forecastle
 Gangway
 Gunwale
 Head
 Hull
 Jackline
 Jibboom
 Keel
 Keel (Canting)
 Kelson
 Leeboard
 Mast
 Orlop deck
 Poop deck
 Prow
 Quarter gallery
 Quarterdeck
 Rudder
 Sail
 Ship's wheel
 Skeg
 Spar (sailing)
 Stem
 Stern
 Sternpost
 Strake
 Tiller
 Top
 Transom
 Whipstaff
 Wind transducer
 Winch

Hull configurations

 Monohull
 Multihull
 Catamaran
 Trimaran

Rigging 
Rigging – apparatus through which the force of the wind is used to propel sailboats and sailing ships forward. This includes spars (masts, yards, etc.), sails, and cordage.

Types of rigs 
 Bermuda rig
 Cat rig
 Crab claw sail
 Fore-and-aft rig
 Full rig

 Fractional rig
 Gaff rig
 Junk rig
 Lateen
 Ljungstrom rig
 Mast aft rig
 Spritsail
 Square rig

Rigging components 
Standing rigging - the fixed lines, wires, or rods, which support each mast or bowsprit on a sailing vessel and reinforce those spars against wind loads transferred from the sails.
 Backstay
 Bobstay
 Chainplates
 Forestay
 Ratlines
 Shroud
 Stay mouse
 Stays
 Turnbuckle
Running rigging - the components used for raising, lowering, shaping and controlling the sails on a sailing vessel
 Block
 Boomkicker
 Braces
 Buntlines
 Cleat
 Clewlines
 Cunningham
 Downhaul
 Earing
 Fairlead
 Gasket
 Gooseneck
 Gunter rig
 Guy
 Halyard
 Peak
 Throat
 Kicker
 Lazy jack
 Outhaul
 Parrel beads
 Preventer
 Spinnaker chute
 Sheet
 Topping lift
 Trapeze
 Traveller
 Vang
General rigging components
 Clevis pin
 Deadeye
 Shackle
 Windex

Types of Spars 
Spar (sailing) – pole of wood, metal or lightweight materials such as carbon fibre used in the rigging of a sailing vessel to carry or support its sail. These include booms and masts, which serve both to deploy sail and resist compressive and bending forces, as well as the bowsprit and spinnaker pole.
 Boom
 Bowsprit
 Boomkin
 Dolphin striker a/k/a Martingale
 Pelican striker
 Fore-mast
 Gaff
 Jackstaff
 Jibboom
 Jigger-mast
 Jury rigging
 Main-mast
 Mast
 Mizzen-mast
 Truck
 Spinnaker pole
 Spreader
 Sprit
 Topmast
 Yard

Sails 
 Sail a device designed to receive and redirect a force upon a surface area. Traditionally, the surface was engineered of woven fabric and supported by a mast, whose purpose is to propel a sailing vessel.

Types of sails 
 Blooper
 Course
 Crab claw
 Driver
 Extra
 Fisherman
 Junk sail
 Lateen
 Lug sail
 Mainsail
 Moonraker
 Parafoil
 Ringtail
 Rotorsail
 Royal
 Screecher
 Skysail
 Spanker
 Spinnaker
 Asymmetrical spinnaker
 Gennaker
 Spritsail
 Staysail
 Jib
 Genoa
 Studding
 Topgallant
 Topsail
 Trysail
 Turbosail
 Watersail
 Wingsail

Sail anatomy 
 Sail material
 Dacron
 Technora
 Kevlar
 Twaron
 Parts of a sail
 Clew
 Foot
 Head
 Leech
 Luff
 Roach
 Tack
 Throat
 Peak

Sailing vessel design and physics 
 Sail-plan
 Racing Rules of Sailing
 Forces on sails

Stability of sailing vessels 
 Turtling (sailing)
 Angle of loll
 Broach (nautical)
 Death roll
 Drogue
 Limit of positive stability
 Metacentric height
 Naval architecture
 Ship stability
 Weight distribution

Sailing activity 
 Five essentials of sailing
 Sail training

Sport sailing 
Sailing (sport) – using sailboats for sporting purposes. It can be recreational or competitive. Competitive sailing is in the form of races.
 Types of races
 Fleet racing – involves sailboats racing one another over a set course. It is the most common form of sailboat racing.
 Match racing – racing between two competitors, going head-to-head.
 Team racing – also known as teams racing, is a popular form of dinghy racing and yacht racing. Two teams consisting of 2, 3, or 4 boats compete together in a race, all the boats being of the one class and reasonably evenly matched. The results of each team are combined to decide the winner
 Race formats and sailing sport events
 Short course racing
 Sailing at the Asian Games
 Sailing at the Summer Paralympics
 Sailing at the Summer Olympics
 America's Cup
 Cowes Week
 Mug Race
 Coastal/Inshore racing
 Swiftsure Yacht Race
 Offshore racing
 Sydney to Hobart Yacht Race
 Transpacific Yacht Race
 Fastnet Race
 Bermuda Race
 Hamilton Island Race Week
 Chicago Yacht Club Race to Mackinac
 Governors Cup
 South Atlantic Race
 Oceanic racing
 Volvo Ocean Race (formerly called the Whitbread Round the World Race)
 Global Challenge
 Clipper Round the World Race.
 Racing Rules of Sailing

 Ruling bodies
 Austrian Sailing Federation
 South African Sailing
 Swedish Sailing Federation
 Swiss Sailing
 US Sailing
 World Sailing

Locations related to sailing
 Shipyard

Sailing organizations 

 International Sailing Federation
 International Association for Disabled Sailing

Sailing publications 

 Australian Sailing magazine
 Blue Water Sailing Magazine
 Boat International Media
 International Boat Industry
 Motor Boats Monthly
 Practical Boat Owner
 SuperYacht Business
 Yachting
 Yacht Harbour
 Yachting (magazine)
 Yachting Monthly
 Yachting World

Persons influential or notable in sailing 
 List of sailboat designers and manufacturers
 List of Olympic medalists in sailing

Notable sailing vessels 
 American Sailboat Hall of Fame
 List of large sailing yachts
 List of schooners
 List of large sailing vessels
 List of clipper ships
 List of longest wooden ships
 List of large sailing sloops
 List of tall ships

See also 

 Glossary of nautical terms

References

External links 

American Sailing Association
US Sailing

The physics of sailing (School of Physics, University of New South Wales, Sydney, Australia)
 

 1
Sailing
Sailing